Elobey Grande, or Great Elobey, is an island of Equatorial Guinea, lying at the mouth of the Mitémélé River. It is sparsely inhabited. Elobey Chico is a smaller island offshore, now uninhabited but once the colonial capital of the Río Muni. The island is located in the Gulf of Guinea.

See also 
Elobey, Annobón and Corisco

References 

Islands of Equatorial Guinea